M18 or M-18 may refer to:

Aircraft
 Messerschmitt M 18, an early German airliner
 Miles M.18, a Miles aircraft
 Mooney M-18 Mite, a low-wing monoplane
 PZL-Mielec M-18 Dromader, an agricultural and aerial-firefighting aircraft

Firearms and military equipment
 M18 Claymore mine, an American anti-personnel landmine
 M18 Hellcat, an American tank destroyer used in World War II
 M18 smoke grenade, a colored smoke grenade
 M18 recoilless rifle, a late-World War II recoilless rifle
 SIG Sauer M18 pistol, a compact, carry sized SIG Sauer P320 used by the United States armed forces

Roads and highways
M18 motorway (Great Britain)
M18 motorway (Ireland)
M-18 (Michigan highway)
 M18 (East London), a Metropolitan Route in East London, South Africa
 M18 (Cape Town), a Metropolitan Route in Cape Town, South Africa
 M18 (Johannesburg), a Metropolitan Route in Johannesburg, South Africa
 M18 (Pretoria), a Metropolitan Route in Pretoria, South Africa
 M18 (Port Elizabeth), a Metropolitan Route in Port Elizabeth, South Africa
 List of M18 roads

Other uses
 M18, a metric screw thread
 Messier 18, an open star cluster in the constellation Sagittarius
 M18 or M-18, Mara 18, Central American street gang
 Hope Municipal Airport, Arkansas, United States (FAA location identifier: M18)
 A line of 18-volt power tools manufactured by Milwaukee Electric Tool Corporation
 M18, a student club at the Bauhaus University, Weimar, Germany